Nick, Nicky or Nicholas Clark or Clarke may refer to:

Nick Clarke (1948–2006), British radio and television presenter and journalist
Nicky Clark (born 1991), Scottish footballer for Dunfermline Athletic
Nicky Clarke (footballer) (born 1967), English footballer
Nicholas Clark, footballer in the 2012–13 Stranraer F.C. season
Nick Clark (character), a character in the television series Fear the Walking Dead 
Nicky Clarke (born 1958), English hair stylist and media personality

See also
Nicholas Goodrick-Clarke (1953–2012), British historian and professor